The Shareef Show Mubarak Ho (previously The Shareef Show) is a late night Pakistani talk show hosted by Umer Shareef, airing on Geo TV. The show was first aired on 26 October 2009 featuring Ghulam Mustafa Khar as a guest.

The Shareef Show invites celebrity guests from the world of film, television, music, fashion, sport and politics.

References

External links 
 

Geo TV original programming
Pakistani television talk shows
2009 Pakistani television series debuts